Cyphostemma crotalarioides is a flowering plant species in the genus Cyphostemma found in Burkina Faso.

Cyphostemmin A and B can be found in the root of C. crotalarioides.

References

External links
 

crotalarioides